Austria competed at the 1924 Summer Olympics in Paris, France, returning to the Olympic Games after not being invited to the 1920 Games because of the nation's role in World War I. 49 competitors, 46 men and 3 women, took part in 27 events in 8 sports.

Medalists

Aquatics

Diving

Three divers represented Austria in 1924. It was the nation's second appearance in the sport. Bornett reached the final in the springboard event, finishing sixth overall.

Ranks given are within the heat.

 Women

Athletics

Seven athletes represented Austria in 1924. It was the nation's fourth appearance in the sport. None of the Austrian athletes reached an event final.

Ranks given are within the heat.

Boxing 

Three boxers represented Austria at the 1924 Games. It was the nation's debut in the sport. All three Austrians were defeated in their first bout.

Equestrian

Two equestrians represented Austria in 1924. It was the nation's debut in the sport.

Fencing

Five fencers, all men, represented Austria in 1924. It was the nation's fifth appearance in the sport.

 Men

Ranks given are within the pool.

Shooting

Six sport shooters represented Austria in 1924. It was the nation's second appearance in the sport.

Weightlifting

Wrestling

Greco-Roman

 Men's

References

External links
 Official Olympic Reports
 International Olympic Committee results database

Nations at the 1924 Summer Olympics
1924
Olympics